A Crown Game Preserve is an officially designated natural area in Ontario, Canada, "primarily for the purpose of sustaining populations of game animals". Hunting is not permitted or strictly regulated, making it akin to a wildlife refuge. Crown Game Preserves are managed by the Government of Ontario Ministry of Natural Resources.

There are currently fifteen Crown Game Preserves:
Brigden Crown Game Preserve
Chapleau Crown Game Preserve
Conestogo Crown Game Preserve
Conroy Marsh Crown Game Preserve
Dumfries Crown Game Preserve
Geikie Island Crown Game Preserve
Himsworth Crown Game Preserve
Miner Crown Game Preserve
Nipissing Crown Game Preserve
Nopiming Crown Game Preserve
Pembroke Crown Game Preserve
Peterborough Crown Game Preserve
Puslinch Crown Game Preserve
Shirley's Bay Crown Game Preserve
Yarmouth Crown Game Preserve

References

Natural areas in Ontario